The Yuanhe Maps and Records of Prefectures and Counties compiled by Li Jifu during the Yuanhe reign of the Tang Dynasty is one of the earliest and most complete gazetteers of China.

The gazetteer was composed of 40 volumes of text with map and a two volume list of contents. The work was divided up by the 47 key geographic areas (镇) that existed at the time. Each area section included a map and was further broken down by prefecture, state, rivers, military battle sites, etc.

Currently only 34 volumes still exist. By the time of the Southern Song Dynasty, the maps, list of contents, and six volumes were missing (Volumes 19, 20, 23, 24, 35, and 36). Because of the loss of the maps, the work is sometimes just titled Yuanhe Records of Prefectures and Counties (元和郡縣志/元和郡县志).

See also
Kuodi Zhi
Yuanhe Xingzuan

Notes

References

 Yuanhe Maps and Records of Prefectures and Counties (元和郡縣圖志), Li, Jifu, and He, Cijun (李吉甫 賀次君). 1983. Zhongguo gu dai di li zong zhi cong kan (中國古代地理總志叢刊). Beijing: Zhong hua shu ju (中華書局 : 新華書店北京發行所發行).

External links
Yuanhe Maps and Records of Prefectures and Counties at the Chinese Text Project

Tang dynasty literature
Gazetteers
Geographic history of China
9th-century Chinese books